Quoin Island may refer to:

 Quoin Island, Torres Strait North of Cape York Peninsula, Australia
Quoin Island (Gladstone Harbour), Queensland, Australia
 Quoin Island (Persian Gulf)